The Krummbach is a left tributary of the Dreisam in the Southern Black Forest east of Freiburg im Breisgau in the German state of Baden-Württemberg. It is just under 17 kilometres long, In its upper reaches it is better known as the Zastlerbach; in its middle course it is also known as the Osterbach.

References

External links 

Rivers of Baden-Württemberg
Rivers of the Black Forest
Breisgau-Hochschwarzwald
Baden
Rivers of Germany